Monte Jayuya is the second highest peak of Puerto Rico measuring  above sea level. The mountain is located in the Cordillera Central, on the border between the municipalities of Jayuya (Barrio Saliente) and Ponce (Barrio Anón). The peak is located in the municipality of Ponce and it is within the Toro Negro State Forest.

References 

Mountains of the Caribbean
Mountains of Puerto Rico
Mountains in Ponce, Puerto Rico
Jayuya, Puerto Rico

Ponce, Puerto Rico
Geography of Puerto Rico